Aghaginduff is a townland in County Tyrone, Northern Ireland. It is situated in the historic barony of Dungannon Lower and the civil parish of Killeeshil and covers an area of 512 acres. Aghaginduff is located approximately 12 km
west of Dungannon, close to Cabragh.

The townland contains St Joseph's Roman Catholic Church.

See also
List of townlands of County Tyrone

References

Townlands of County Tyrone
Civil parish of Killeeshil